Pearce is a surname, from knights of the Norman lord Mansfield prior to the invasion of England. It derives etymologically from the Germanic word to pierce, and was a name commonly given to warrior caste in Saxon/Jute, p-celtic and oil languages. Another etymology is from Piers, the medieval vernacular form of Peter, and may refer to:

People
Adam Pearce (born 1978), American professional wrestler
Adrienne Pearce, South African actress
Al Pearce (1898–1961), American comedian, singer and banjoist
Alec Pearce (1910–1982), English cricketer
Alex Pearce (born 1988), English footballer
Alexander Pearce (1790–1824), escapee from Macquarie Harbour Penal Station
Alice Pearce (1917–1966), American actress
Allan Pearce (born 1983), New Zealand soccer player
Andy Pearce (born 1966), English footballer
Austin Pearce (1921–2004), British manager
Barcley Pearce (born 1970), Canadian ice hockey player
Beth Pearce, Vermont government official
Bill Pearce (1926–2010), American singer and trombonist
Billy Pearce, English actor and comedian
Bob Pearce (born 1946), Australian politician
Bobby Pearce (rower) (1905–1976), Australian-Canadian sculler
Bobby Pearce (designer) (born 1961), American costume designer
Brad Pearce (tennis) (born 1966), American tennis player
Brad Pearce (footballer) (born 1971), Australian rules footballer
Brian Pearce (1915–2008), British politician, historian, and translator
Bryan Pearce (1929–2007), British painter
Bunny Pearce (1885–1933), American baseball player
Caroline Pearce (born 1981), English athlete
Charles Pearce (disambiguation), various including:
Christopher or Chris Pearce (disambiguation)
Clancee Pearce (born 1990), Australian rules footballer
Cliff Pearce, Australian rugby league footballer
Col Pearce (1917–2004), Australian rugby league referee
Colby Pearce (born 1972), American cyclist
Col Pearce (1917–2004), Australian rugby league referee
Colman Pearce (born 1938), Irish pianist and conductor
Craig Pearce, Australian actor and writer
Cromwell Pearce (1772–1852), U.S. Army colonel during the War of 1812
Daniel Pearce (born 1978), English musician
Danyle Pearce (born 1986), Australian rules footballer
Darius J. Pearce (born 1972), Jersey politician
David Pearce (disambiguation)
Deb Pearce, Canadian broadcaster and comedian
Denis Pearce (1896–1968), British fencer
Dennis Pearce (born 1974), English footballer
Dickey Pearce (1836–1908), early baseball player who started with the Brooklyn Atlantics in 1856
Donn Pearce (1928–2017), American author of Cool Hand Luke
Douglas Pearce (born 1956), English folk musician Douglas P.
Drew Pearce (born 1975), English writer, producer and director
Drue Pearce (born 1951), American businesswoman and politician
Dutee Jerauld Pearce (1789–1849), American politician
Eddie Pearce (born 1952), American golfer
Edgar Pearce (born 1937/38), British criminal convicted of the Mardi Gras bombings
Edmund Pearce (1870–1935), English bishop
Edward Pearce (disambiguation)
Eric Pearce (disambiguation)
Ernest Pearce (1865–1930), English bishop
Eve Pearce (born 1929), Scottish actress
Francis Tring Pearce (1846–1935), English director of Priday, Metford and Company Limited
Frank Pearce (disambiguation)
Fred Pearce (born 1951), English journalist
Gary Pearce (disambiguation)
George Pearce (disambiguation)
Graham Pearce (English footballer) (born 1963), English footballer
Greg Pearce (disambiguation)
Guy Pearce (born 1967), Australian actor
Heath Pearce (born 1984), American soccer player
Hen Pearce (1777–1809), English prizefighter
Henry Pearce (disambiguation)
Howard Pearce (born 1949), English-born Governor of the Falkland Islands
Ian Pearce (born 1974), English footballer
Irene Pearce (1900–2012), British supercentenarian
Ivy May Pearce (1914–1998), Australian pilot and business owner
Jackson Pearce (born 1984), American author
Jacqueline Pearce (1943–2018), British actress
James Pearce (1805–1862), American politician
Jason Pearce (born 1987), English footballer
Jeff Pearce (American musician) (born 1967), American ambient guitarist
Jeff Pearce (Canadian musician) (born 1967), Canadian musician
Jim Pearce (disambiguation)
Jimmy Pearce (born 1947), English footballer
Joe Pearce (Australian rugby league) (1910–1995), Australian rugby league footballer
Joe Pearce (footballer) (1885–1915), Australian rules footballer
Joe Pearce (British rugby league), rugby league footballer of the 1920s and 1930s
John Pearce (disambiguation)
Jonathan Pearce (disambiguation)
Jordan Pearce (born 1986), American ice hockey player
Joseph Pearce (disambiguation)
Josh Pearce (born 1977), American baseball player
Joshua Pearce, (living) American scientist and engineer
Julian Pearce (field hockey) (born 1937), Australian field hockey player
Kevin Pearce (disambiguation)
Krystian Pearce (born 1990), English footballer
Laurence Pearce (born 1990), English rugby league and union player
Lawrence Pearce (born 1980), English film writer and director
Lennard Pearce (1915–1984), British actor
Leslie Pearce (disambiguation)
Lindsay Pearce, American actress and singer
Mahal Pearce (born 1977), New Zealand golfer
Mark Pearce (disambiguation)
Mark Guy Pearse (1842–1930), British preacher, lecturer and author
Martin Pearce (born 1983), English cricketer
Mary Vivian Pearce (born 1947), American actress
Michael Pearce (author) (1933–2022), Anglo-Egyptian Sudan author
Michael Pearce (artist) (born 1965), British, California based artist
Mitchell Pearce (born 1989), Australian Rugby League player
Monty J. Pearce (born 1948, member of the Idaho senate
Nancy Pearcey (born 1952), American Christian author
Nathaniel Pearce (1779–1820), British explorer
Nathan Pearce (1977), husband, father, and baker at Gluten Free Galley in Raleigh, NC
Nicholas Bartlett Pearce, American Civil War general in the Union Army
Pard Pearce (1896–1974), American football player
Paul Pearce (born 1956), Australian politician
Perce Pearce (1900–1955), American producer, director, and writer
Philippa Pearce (1920–2006), English writer for children
Pippa Pearce MBE, Conservator
Reylene Pearce, Australian actress
Richard Pearce (disambiguation)
Robert Pearce (disambiguation)
Rudolph Pearce (born 1945), Jamaican footballer
Russell Pearce (1947-2023), American politician
Ruth Pearce Australian ambassador
Sam Pearce (born 1997), Welsh cricketer
Sandy Pearce (1883–1930), Australian rugby league footballer and boxer
Sarah Pearce (born 1965), British professor of history
Shaun Pearce (born 1969), British canoeist
Shirley Pearce, English professor
Stanley Pearce (1863–1929), English cricketer
Stephen Pearce (1819–1904), English painter
Steve Pearce (disambiguation)
Stevo Pearce (born 1962), British record label owner
Stuart Pearce (born 1962), English football coach
Suzie Muirhead (born 1975), New Zealand field hockey player known as Suzie Pearce until she married
Sydney Pearce (1883–1930), Australian rugby league player
Teresa Pearce (born 1955), British politician
Thomas Pearce (disambiguation)
Tom Pearce (cricketer) (1905–1994), English cricketer and rugby union official
Tom Pearce (footballer)
Vera Pearce (1895–1966), Australian actress
Virginia H. Pearce (born 1945), author and member of Young Women organization of The Church of Jesus Christ of Latter-day Saints
Walter Pearce (disambiguation)
Wayne Pearce (born 1960), Australian captain of the Rugby League Club Balmain Tigers from 1982 to 1990
William Pearce (disambiguation)
Zachary Pearce (1690–1774), English bishop

Fictional characters
Aiden Pearce, from the video game Watch Dogs
Harry Pearce, from the British television series Spooks
Lola Pearce, from the British soap opera EastEnders
Melissa Pearce, from the Japanese novel Parasite Eve
Mickey Pearce, from the British sitcom Only Fools and Horses
Phil Pearce, from the British soap opera Emmerdale Farm
Ruth Pearce, from the British soap opera Doctors

See also
Justice Pearce (disambiguation)
Pearse (surname)
Peirce (surname)
Pierce (surname)
Pearce (given name)

English-language surnames
Surnames from given names